James Andrew Welbon Haskell (born 2 April 1985) is an English former rugby union player who played for Wasps RFC and Northampton Saints in the Aviva Premiership, and internationally for England.

In August 2019 he announced he would become a professional mixed martial artist and is currently signed to Bellator MMA, where he is to compete in their Heavyweight division. In November 2019, it was announced that Haskell would be participating in the nineteenth series of I'm a Celebrity...Get Me Out of Here!.

Early life
James Andrew Welbon Haskell was born on 2 April 1985 in Windsor, Berkshire

He was educated at Papplewick School in Ascot, Berkshire  and Wellington College in Crowthorne, also in Berkshire.

Club career
Haskell played for Maidenhead Rugby Club prior to joining (Wasps RFC), where he was part of the highly successful Colts set up. He was a replacement as Wasps won the 2007 Heineken Cup Final.
The following season he started as Wasps won the 2007–08 Premiership Final. It was announced on 17 February 2009 that Haskell would join Top 14 side Stade Francais at the end of the 2008–09 season.

Haskell played as a loose forward. He announced at the end of the 2010–11 season that he had been released from his contract at Stade Francais, and would instead be rejoining Wasps at the start of the 2012–13 season. During the season after the World Cup, he would play in Japan for the Rams, before seeking a Super Rugby contract for the rest of the season.

In 2011, Haskell agreed to join the Highlanders in Super Rugby, saying he has always wanted to play in new environments and to "improve and become a better player for England". While there, Haskell was competing for the Flanker position with future Scotland international, John Hardie.

In January 2018 it was announced he would leave Wasps at the end of the 2017–18 Aviva Premiership season.

On 7 May 2019 Haskell announced his retirement from professional rugby via an Instagram post.

International career

England
Haskell represented England at under-17, 18 and under-19 levels as well as playing for England Sevens. He also played for Wales at under-18 level, qualifying thanks to his Welsh mother, and is also qualified to play for Ireland. In the 2007 Six Nations, Haskell was called into the starting line-up for the final game of the tournament for England against Wales at the Millennium Stadium in Cardiff, where he was part of a back row that was for the first time provided by one club - Joe Worsley and Tom Rees were the other players from Wasps. He just missed out on selection for the 2007 Rugby World Cup for England, despite spending the summer in their training camp. He played a prominent role in the England team in the 2008 Six Nations. Haskell appeared in both tests of the 2008 summer tour of New Zealand.

Haskell was selected by Martin Johnson for the 2008/2009 Elite Player Squad on 1 July 2008. He appeared in all three autumn internationals, starting against South Africa. Haskell participated in every game of the 2009 Six Nations, though he lost his starting berth to Tom Croft.

Haskell's performances for Stade and injury to Tom Croft meant he returned to the England squad, and he scored two tries against Wales in the first match of the 2010 Six Nations. He started all subsequent games. During a rest week in the Six Nations, Stade requested his return to Paris to face Toulouse that weekend. The RFU held firm, however, and he remained in England.

Haskell was a member of Stuart Lancaster's 31-man squad for the 2015 Rugby World Cup, however, he was left on the bench in favour of Tom Wood as England crashed out in the group stages.

Haskell was named as the 'man of the series' during England's 3–0 series victory over Australia in June 2016.

British & Irish Lions
On 21 May 2017, Haskell was called up to the British & Irish Lions due to an injury to Billy Vunipola.

MMA career
In August 2019, Haskell signed to mixed martial arts promotion Bellator MMA as part of its Heavyweight division. Haskell had previously done analysis and commentary work for English promotions such as BAMMA and CFF.

In February 2020, it was announced that Haskell would make his professional mixed martial arts debut on 16 May 2020 at Wembley's SSE Arena. The event was ultimately postponed due to the Coronavirus outbreak.

After having numerous injuries still stemming from his rugby career and eventually having spinal surgery in September 2021, Haskell decided to forgo his MMA career.

I'm a Celebrity...Get Me Out of Here!
In November 2019, it was announced that Haskell would be participating in the nineteenth series of I'm a Celebrity...Get Me Out of Here!. He ultimately became the fourth person to be voted off.

Personal life
Haskell is married to television presenter Chloe Madeley; the couple started dating in 2014. Haskell announced on Good Morning Britain in February 2022 that he and his wife Chloe are expecting a baby girl.

Haskell was suspended from Wellington College for producing a non-consensual film showing his friend Paul Doran-Jones having sex with his then girlfriend in school accommodation using a hidden camera. They then showed classmates the film. Doran-Jones was expelled and Haskell suspended for the incident. Haskell later made light of the incident in a YouTube podcast in 2019 joking, 'All I am going to say is this. My idea, Paul was execution' and 'I was nothing to do with it apart from, obviously, it was my idea'.

In 2011, Haskell was accused of sexually harassing a hotel worker alongside fellow England Players Dylan Hartley and Chris Ashton.

References

External links
 
 

1985 births
Living people
England international rugby union players
English rugby union players
Expatriate rugby union players in France
Wasps RFC players
People educated at Wellington College, Berkshire
Rugby union flankers
Stade Français players
English expatriate rugby union players
Expatriate rugby union players in Japan
Expatriate rugby union players in New Zealand
English expatriate sportspeople in New Zealand
English expatriate sportspeople in France
English expatriate sportspeople in Japan
I'm a Celebrity...Get Me Out of Here! (British TV series) participants
People educated at Papplewick School
Black Rams Tokyo players
Highlanders (rugby union) players
Rugby union players from Windsor, Berkshire
British & Irish Lions rugby union players from England
Northampton Saints players
Madeley family